Eric Ang (born February 2, 1971) is a shooter from the Philippines. He represented the country in the 2008 Summer Olympics.  He lost in the contention for any medal by placing 30th on the qualifying rounds for Men's Trap on the second day of the games.

References

See also
Philippines at the 2008 Summer Olympics

1971 births
Living people
Filipino male sport shooters
Trap and double trap shooters
Olympic shooters of the Philippines
Shooters at the 2008 Summer Olympics
Asian Games medalists in shooting
Shooters at the 1998 Asian Games
Shooters at the 2002 Asian Games
Shooters at the 2006 Asian Games
Shooters at the 2010 Asian Games
Shooters at the 2014 Asian Games
Asian Games bronze medalists for the Philippines
Southeast Asian Games bronze medalists for the Philippines
Southeast Asian Games silver medalists for the Philippines
Southeast Asian Games medalists in shooting
Medalists at the 2002 Asian Games
Competitors at the 2005 Southeast Asian Games
Competitors at the 2019 Southeast Asian Games
Southeast Asian Games gold medalists for the Philippines
Southeast Asian Games competitors for the Philippines